"På promenad genom stan" is a song written and performed by Per Gessle and is the second single from his fourth studio album Mazarin. It describes a walk through his native city of Halmstad, describing various points of interest in the town. The song is a duet with Gessle's fellow Roxette-singer Marie Fredriksson, which is one of her first records released after falling ill in 2002.

Track listing
"På promenad genom stan"
"Inte tillsammans, inte isär" (Demo)

Charts

References

Per Gessle songs
Songs written by Per Gessle
2003 singles